Dysmorphopsia, in a broad sense, is a condition in which a person is unable to correctly perceive objects. It is a visual distortion, used to denote a variant of metamorphopsia in which lines appear wavy. These illusions may be restricted to certain visuals areas, or may affect the entire visual field.

It has been associated with meningioma tumors and bilateral lateral occipital corital damage, e.g. after carbon monoxide poisoning or drug abuse.

Etymology
The term dysmorphopsia comes from the Greek words dus (bad), morphè (form) and opsis (seeing).

See also

 Hallucination
 Macropsia
 Metamorphopsia
 Micropsia
 Occipital lobe
 Visual perception

References

Visual disturbances and blindness
Neurological disorders

Further reading
 A Dictionary of Hallucinations
 A neurological disorder presumably underlies painter Francis Bacon distorted world depiction
 Dysmorphopsia: a notable variant of the "thin man" phenomenon?